The Hutchinson Elks were a minor league baseball team based in Hutchinson, Kansas. Between 1934 and 1954 the team played in the Western Association. The team first began in 1934 as the Hutchinson Larks. The following year the club came a minor league affiliate of the St. Louis Cardinals before spending the next 7 seasons affiliated with the Pittsburgh Pirates. In 1939 the team's name changed to the Hutchinson Pirates. After World War II, the club became and affiliate of the Chicago Cubs and became the Hutchinson Cubs, winning their first league title in 1946. On July 21, 1948, club then moved to Springfield, Missouri and became the Springfield Cubs.

The following year the Pirates reestablished a franchise in Hutchinson which existed until 1954. Under the Pirates, Hutchinson won two more league championships, in 1950 and 1953, both under manager Wes Griffin.

Season-by-season

References

Baseball teams established in 1934
Baseball teams disestablished in 1954
Defunct minor league baseball teams
Professional baseball teams in Kansas
Defunct baseball teams in Kansas
Pittsburgh Pirates minor league affiliates
Chicago Cubs minor league affiliates
St. Louis Cardinals minor league affiliates
1954 disestablishments in Kansas
1934 establishments in Kansas
Hutchinson, Kansas
Defunct Western Association teams